Henduabad (also Romanized as Hendūābād) is a village in Kachu Rural District, in the Central District of Ardestan County, Isfahan Province, Iran. At the 2006 census, its population was 437, in 121 families.

References 

Populated places in Ardestan County